Frankamenite is the fluorine-dominate variation of the rare mineral canasite with a general formula of K3Na3Ca5(Si12O30)[F,(OH)]4·(H2O). 

Frankamenite belongs to the triclinic crystal system, with the bases of its structure containing Ca-Na mixed octahedra joined by octagonal tubes SiO4 of the composition (Si12O30). Frankamenite has six Ca-Na mixed positions distributed amongst these octahedra, reflecting its varying compositions.

Frankamenite was named for the Russian mineralogist-crystallographer V. A. Frank-Kamentsky (1915–1994), who discovered the mineral. 

Frankamenite occurs in association with the rare mineral charoite, which is found only in the Murun Massif of the Olyokma-Chara Plateau, Aldan Shield, Sakha Republic, Yakutia, Siberia, Russia. Here, metasomatism enriches a syenite massif with potassium when it comes into contact with a limestone at around 200–250 °C. This metamorphic process produces a potassium feldspar metasomatite, the typical geological environment for canasite and, therefore, frankamenite. Frankamenite and charoitein are exclusive to the Sakha Republic in this sort of environment, as mineralogists have yet to discover the minerals elsewhere.

References

Calcium minerals
Inosilicates
Potassium minerals
Sodium minerals
Triclinic minerals
Minerals in space group 1